Danio flagrans  is a species of Danio endemic to India.

References

Danio
Fish described in 2007
Freshwater fish of India
Cyprinid fish of Asia